In organometallic chemistry, a sandwich compound is a chemical compound featuring a metal bound by haptic, covalent bonds to two arene (ring) ligands. The arenes have the formula , substituted derivatives (for example ) and heterocyclic derivatives (for example ). Because the metal is usually situated between the two rings, it is said to be "sandwiched". A special class of sandwich complexes are the metallocenes.

The term sandwich compound was introduced in organometallic nomenclature in 1956 in a report by J. D. Dunitz, L. E. Orgel and R. A. Rich, who confirmed the structure of ferrocene by X-ray crystallography.  The correct structure, in which the molecule features an iron atom sandwiched between two parallel cyclopentadienyl rings, had been proposed several years previously by Robert Burns Woodward and, separately, by Ernst Otto Fischer.  The structure helped explain puzzles about ferrocene's conformers. This result further demonstrated the power of X-ray crystallography and accelerated the growth of organometallic chemistry.

Classes
 
The best known members are the metallocenes of the formula  where M = Cr, Fe, Co, Ni, Pb, Zr, Ru, Rh, Os, Sm, Ti, V, Mo, W, Zn.  These species are also called bis(cyclopentadienyl)metal complexes. Other arenes can serve as ligands as well.
Mixed cyclopentadienyl complexes: .  Some examples are  where the fullerene ligand is acting as a cyclopentadienyl analogue.
Bis(benzene) complexes: , the best known example being bis(benzene)chromium.
Metal–carborane complexes (metallacarboranes), a very large and diverse family in which main-group or transition metal ions are coordinated to carborane ligands to form polyhedral cages ranging in size from 6 to 15 vertices.
 

Closely related are the metal complexes containing  (diborolyl) ligands.

Half-sandwich compounds

Monometallic half-sandwich compounds

Metallocenes including just one facially-bound planar organic ligand instead of two gives rise to a still larger family of half-sandwich compounds.  The most famous example is probably methylcyclopentadienyl manganese tricarbonyl.  Such species are occasionally referred to as piano-stool compounds, at least when there are three diatomic ligands in addition to the hydrocarbon "seat" of the piano stool.  The name derives from the similarity of the structure to such a "stool" with the seat being a facial planar organic compound, such as benzene or cyclopentadiene, and the legs being ligands such as CO or allyl.

Dimetallic half-sandwich 
Compounds such as the cyclopentadienyliron dicarbonyl dimer and cyclopentadienylmolybdenumtricarbonyl dimer can be considered a special case of half-sandwiches, except that they are dimetallic.

Multidecker sandwiches
The first isolated multidecker sandwich was the tris(cyclopentadienyl)dinickel triple-decker complex , a highly air- and water-sensitive compound reported in 1972, with X-ray crystallographic confirmation in 1974.

In 1973 the electrically neutral air-stable triple-decker cobaltacarborane sandwiches 1,7,2,3- and 1,7,2,4- (where R = H, Me) were isolated and characterized by multinuclear NMR and X-ray studies (the structure of the 1,7,2,3 isomer is shown).
 
Since then many three-, four-, five-, and six-decker sandwich complexes have been described. The largest structurally characterized multidecker sandwich monomer is the hexadecker shown at lower right.
 
An extensive family of multidecker sandwiches incorporating planar  (diborolyl) ligands has also been prepared.

Numerous multidecker sandwich compounds featuring hydrocarbon bridging rings have also been prepared, especially triple deckers.  A versatile method involves the attachment of Cp*Ru+ to preformed sandwich complexes.

Linked sandwiches
Monomeric double-decker and multidecker sandwiches have been used as building blocks for extended systems, some of which exhibit electron delocalization between metal centers. 
An example of a cyclic poly(metallacarborane) complex is the octahedral "carbon-wired" system shown below, which contains a planar  macrocycle.

Inverse sandwiches
In these anti-bimetallic compounds, the metals are found to be bridged by a single carbocyclic ring.

Double- and multimetallic sandwich compounds
Another family of sandwich compound involves more than one metal sandwiched between two carbocyclic rings. Depicted at right is an example of a multimetallic sandwich compound, which has four palladium atoms joined in a chain sandwiched between two perylene units. The counterions are bulky tetraarylborates.

Applications
Ferrocene and methylcyclopentadienyl manganese tricarbonyl have been used as antiknock agents.  Certain bent metallocenes of zirconium and hafnium are effective precatalysts for the polymerization of propylene.  Many half sandwich complexes of ruthenium, such as those derived from (cymene)ruthenium dichloride dimer catalyse transfer hydrogenation, a useful reaction in organic synthesis.

References